Jean Evrard Kouassi (born 25 September 1994) is an Ivorian professional footballer who plays as a winger for Chinese Super League club Zhejiang and Ivory Coast national team.

Club career
Kouassi played for the Ivorian football club Moossou F.C. youth team before going abroad to have trials with TSG 1899 Hoffenheim, Club Brugge and Monaco before having a successful trial with Croatian club Hajduk Split who offered him a three-year contract in January 2013. He made his debut in a league game against Slaven Belupo on 16 February 2013 that ended in a 2–0 victory. He gradually started to establish himself within the team and on 21 April 2013, Kouassi scored in a draw against Slaven Belupo, marking the 4000th jubilee championship goal for HNK Hajduk Split. He further endeared himself towards the fans when he scored and assisted for a goal against Lokomotiva in the 2012–13 Croatian Cup final, which the club won 5–4 on aggregate.

Chinese Super League club Shanghai SIPG announced that Kouassi had joined the squad in February 2015 and signed a contract until 2017. He made his debut in a league game on 7 March 2015 against Jiangsu Guoxin-Sainty F.C. in a game that ended in a 2–1 victory.

On 18 January 2017, Kouassi moved to League One side Wuhan Zall. On 18 June 2017, he scored his first goal against Dalian Transcendence. He helped the club earn promotion to the Super League by winning the China League One title in 2018, forming a strong strike partnership with Rafael Silva and netting 15 league goals.

On 22 January 2023, Kouassi returned to China to join top tier club Zhejiang Professional.

International career
Kouassi was named in the Ivorian squad for the 2011 African U-17 Championship. He scored in the game against Gambia on 15 January 2011.
He was also named in the Ivorian squad for the 2011 FIFA U-17 World Cup. He played in all four games before the Ivorians were eliminated from the competition by France in the round of 16.

He made his debut for Ivory Coast national team on 30 March 2021 in a 2021 Africa Cup of Nations qualifier against Ethiopia and scored his team's third goal in a 3-1 victory.

Career statistics

Honours
Hajduk Split
Croatian Cup: 2012–13

Wuhan Zall
China League One: 2018

Trabzonspor
 Süper Lig: 2021–22
 Turkish Super Cup: 2022

References

External links
 HNK Hajduk Split profile
 

1994 births
Living people
Ivorian footballers
Association football forwards
Ivory Coast international footballers
Ivory Coast youth international footballers
Croatian Football League players
Moossou FC players
HNK Hajduk Split players
Shanghai Port F.C. players
Wuhan F.C. players
Trabzonspor footballers
Fatih Karagümrük S.K. footballers
Zhejiang Professional F.C. players
Chinese Super League players
China League One players
Süper Lig players
Ivorian expatriate footballers
Ivorian expatriate sportspeople in Croatia
Expatriate footballers in Croatia
Ivorian expatriate sportspeople in China
Expatriate footballers in China
Ivorian expatriate sportspeople in Turkey
Expatriate footballers in Turkey
2021 Africa Cup of Nations players